|}

The Hardwicke Stakes is a Group 2 flat horse race in Great Britain open to horses aged four years or older. It is run at Ascot over a distance of 1 mile 3 furlongs and 211 yards (2,406 metres), and it is scheduled to take place each year in June.

History
The event is named in honour of the 5th Earl of Hardwicke, who served as the Master of the Buckhounds in the 19th century. It was established in 1879, and it was originally open to horses aged three or older. The last three-year-old to win was Helioscope in 1949.

The Hardwicke Stakes is now held on the final day of the five-day Royal Ascot meeting. The leading horses often return to the venue to compete in the following month's King George VI and Queen Elizabeth Stakes. The first to win both races in the same year was Aureole in 1954, and the most recent was Harbinger in 2010.

Records
Most successful horse (3 wins):
 Tristan  – 1882, 1883, 1884

Leading jockey (7 wins):
 Lester Piggott – Elopement (1955), St Paddy (1961), Karabas (1970), Relay Race (1974), Meneval (1977), Critique (1982), Jupiter Island (1985)
 Pat Eddery – Charlie Bubbles (1975), Orange Bay (1976), Dihistan (1986), Assatis (1989), Rock Hopper (1991, 1992), Posidonas (1998)

Leading trainer (11 wins):
 Sir Michael Stoute – Dihistan (1986), Rock Hopper (1991, 1992), Maraahel (2006, 2007), Harbinger (2010), Sea Moon (2012), Telescope (2014), Snow Sky (2015), Dartmouth (2016), Crystal Ocean (2018)

Winners since 1923

Earlier winners

 1879: Chippendale
 1880: Exeter *
 1881: Peter
 1882: Tristan
 1883: Tristan
 1884: Tristan
 1885: Bendigo
 1886: Ormonde
 1887: Ormonde
 1888: Minting
 1889: Gulliver
 1890: Amphion
 1891: L'Abbesse de Jouarre
 1892: St Damien
 1893: Watercress
 1894: Ravensbury
 1895: Barbary
 1896: Shaddock
 1897: Bay Ronald
 1898: Collar
 1899: Ninus
 1900: Boniface
 1901: Merry Gal
 1902: Joshua
 1903: Sceptre
 1904: Rock Sand
 1905: Bachelor's Button
 1906: Wombwell
 1907: Beppo
 1908: Bembo
 1909: Primer
 1910: Swynford
 1911: Swynford
 1912: Stedfast
 1913: Lancaster
 1914: Peter the Hermit
 1915–18: no race
 1919: Sir Douglas
 1920: Black Gauntlet
 1921: Franklin
 1922: Welsh Spear

* The 1880 winner Exeter was later exported to Argentina and renamed El Plata.

See also
 Horse racing in Great Britain
 List of British flat horse races

References
 Paris-Turf:
 Racing Post:

 galopp-sieger.de – Hardwicke Stakes.
 horseracingintfed.com – International Federation of Horseracing Authorities – Hardwicke Stakes (2018).
 pedigreequery.com – Hardwicke Stakes – Ascot.
 

Flat races in Great Britain
Ascot Racecourse
Open middle distance horse races
Recurring sporting events established in 1879
1879 establishments in England